Bilaspur is a Lok Sabha parliamentary constituency in Chhattisgarh.

Assembly segments
Bilaspur Lok Sabha constituency is composed of the following assembly segments:

Members of Parliament

Election results

 2004 Lok Sabha Elections, Reserved seat for SC candidates. 
Winner - Punnulal Mohle	(BJP) : 324,729  votes 
Runner-up : Dr. Basant Pahre (INC)  : 243,176

See also
 Bilaspur, Chhattisgarh
 List of Constituencies of the Lok Sabha

References

Lok Sabha constituencies in Chhattisgarh
Bilaspur district, Chhattisgarh